Henao Sam (born 20 September 1985) is a Papua New Guinean woman cricketer. She represented Papua New Guinea in the 2008 Women's Cricket World Cup Qualifier.

References 

1985 births
Living people
Papua New Guinean women cricketers